The Changde–Yiyang–Changsha high-speed railway or Changyichang high-speed railway, also known as the Changde–Changsha section of Chongqing–Xiamen high-speed railway, is a high-speed railway in China. The Changde–Yiyang section also forms part of the Hohhot–Nanning corridor.

Hanshou railway station and Changde railway station opened on 26 December 2022.

Route
The railway runs parallel the existing Shimen–Changsha railway between Changde and Changsha.

Stations

References

High-speed railway lines in China
Railway lines opened in 2022